Patsy Evelyn Ann Riggir  (born 6 October 1945) is a New Zealand country and western singer and songwriter. She was a regular performer on the New Zealand Country and Western television show That's Country, had her own show Patsy Riggir Country in 1986, and has appeared on various shows including the Ralph Emery Show, the Fan Fair International Show and the Grand Ole Opry.

Biography
Riggir was born in the South Waikato town of Arapuni, and was educated at Te Kuiti School, and Te Kuiti and Putaruru High Schools. She entered several talent quests and sang on IXH Hamilton aged 5, but then gave up singing until she joined the local country music club in 1974. Her first album, True Country Music, was released in 1980.

She has received many awards including New Zealand Entertainer of the Year in 1980, various APRA Awards for Best Female Vocalist, Best Song, Best Songwriter etc. and various NZRIA awards. She represented New Zealand at country music gatherings in Fort Worth, Texas in 1983 & 1984, Nashville in 1987, and was inducted into the Tamworth, NSW Hall of Fame in 1982. In the 1994 New Year Honours, Riggir was awarded the Queen's Service Medal for community service. She now lives near Putāruru.

Discography

Albums

Awards
Riggir was the first winner of Gore's Golden Guitar Awards in 1974

Country Music Awards of Australia
The Country Music Awards of Australia (CMAA) (also known as the Golden Guitar Awards) is an annual awards night held in January during the Tamworth Country Music Festival, celebrating recording excellence in the Australian country music industry. They have been held annually since 1973.

|-
| 1981
| "It's Not Love"
| New Talent of the Year
| 
|-
| 1984
| "Beautiful Lady"
| Female Vocalist of the Year
| 
|-
| 1985
| You'll Never Take the Country Out of Me
| Female Vocalist of the Year
| 
|-
| 1986
| You Remind Me of a Love Song
| Female Vocalist of the Year
| 
|-
| 1987
| Country
| Top Selling
| 

 Note: wins only

RIANZ Awards 
Riggir won a number of RIANZ New Zealand Music Awards. She has had a total of 19 nominations including 7 wins.

References

1945 births
Living people
New Zealand country singers
New Zealand women singer-songwriters
People from Arapuni
Recipients of the Queen's Service Medal
20th-century New Zealand women singers
21st-century New Zealand women singers
People educated at Te Kuiti High School
People educated at Putāruru College